69th Siege Battery was a heavy howitzer unit of Britain's Royal Garrison Artillery (RGA) raised in Sussex during  World War I. It saw active service on the Western Front at the Somme, Arras and Messines, against the German spring offensive, and in the final Allied Hundred Days Offensive.

Mobilisation
On the outbreak of war in August 1914, units of the part-time Territorial Force (TF) were invited to volunteer for Overseas Service and the majority of the Sussex Royal Garrison Artillery did so. This unit had mobilised as part of No 10 Coastal Fire Command, responsible for the defence of Newhaven. By October 1914, the campaign on the Western Front was bogging down into Trench warfare and there was an urgent need for batteries of siege artillery to be sent to France. The WO decided that the TF coastal gunners were well enough trained to take over many of the duties in the coastal defences, releasing Regular RGA gunners for service in the field. Soon the TF RGA companies that had volunteered for overseas service were also supplying trained gunners to RGA units serving overseas and providing cadres to form complete new units.

A company from the Sussex RGA provided half the personnel for 69th Siege Battery, RGA when it was formed on 9 October 1915, the remainder being 'Kitchener's Army' volunteers. Together with 68th Siege Bty it constituted C Siege Brigade (Training) until that was broken up in January 916. The two batteries then joined 70th Siege Bty in C Siege Brigade (Training) at Lydd Camp. At Lydd the men were introduced to modern heavy guns, but did gun drill on 9.45-inch Skoda howitzers from the Second Boer War and their actual field firing with 8-inch rifled muzzle-loading howitzers from 1879. Other units under training at Lydd at this time included 67th and 76th Siege Btys and five South African Heavy Artillery batteries (71st, 72nd, 73rd, 74th, 75th).

On 19 February 1916 the Army Service Corps formed 652 Company as Battery Ammunition Column Motor Transport for 68th and 69th Siege Btys. The battery mobilised at Taunton on 28 February under the command of Major H.G. Carr, with Maj A.J. Martineau of the Sussex RGA as second-in-command. During March it received four 9.2-inch howitzers and was joined by 652 Company. On 29 March it despatched its guns and transport by road to Avonmouth Docks where they were loaded aboard HM Transport Aragon, and on 31 March the men went by train to Southampton where they embarked on the SS Lydia, together with 76th Siege Bty with whom they had trained at Lydd, arriving at Boulogne on 1 April.

Western Front
The guns had been unloaded and overhauled by 16 April and next day the battery left for the front by lorry, the guns following by train, arriving at La Houssoye on 19 April. The battery joined 27th Heavy Artillery Group (HAG) supporting III Corps in Fourth Army. Shortly afterwards, 652 Company ASC was absorbed into the group's ammunition column. The gunners spent a week digging positions; two guns were ready for action by 27 April, all four on 29 April. They spent another 10 days preparing dugouts before firing their first rounds on 10 May to begin registering their guns on targets. It then carried out a few counter-battery (CB) shoots. On 19 May the battery came under the command of 30th HAG, a newly-arrived headquarters.

Somme

Fourth Army was preparing for that year's 'Big Push', the Battle of the Somme, with III Corps facing the German redoubts in front of Ovillers. The bombardment was to extend over five days, U, V, W, X and Y, before the assault was launched on Z day. The strenuous work of firing the heavy guns and howitzers was divided into 2-hour periods to allow the gunners to rest, Forward Observation Officers (FOOs) to be relieved, and the guns to cool. The bombardment began on 24 June, and for 69th Siege Bty it reached a crescendo of 444 rounds on X (27 June– on which day a premature shell burst killed two and wounded six gunners in the battery), but on several days the weather was too bad for good air or ground observation and the programme was extended by two days (Y1 and Y2). The infantry commanders were still dissatisfied with the effects on Ovillers (many shells failed to burst) and brought up trench mortars to supplement the heavies. The final bombardment began at 06.25 on Z Day (1 July). When the infantry launched their assault at 07.30, III Corps had its heavy guns lengthen their range in a series of timed 'lifts' ahead of them. However, the bombardment had failed to knock out many of the machine gun positions, and as soon as the attackers went 'over the top' they began to take heavy casualties. 8th Division attacking up the Ovillers spur gained only a few footholds in the opposing lines, and it was impossible to renew the attack in the afternoon.

The bombardment resumed next day, with 69th Siege Bty having to replace the beams on which its howitzers rested because they were splitting. Fire continued over the following days on targets in Contalmaison, Pozières and Courcelette as the offensive continued, the battery moving forward by sections to shorten the range. On 31 July it suffered a number of casualties from enemy fire and Right Section withdrew to a safer position. The battery shelled Martinpuich and High Wood intermittently until mid-September in support of the continuing attacks. It then moved up to Contalmaison to bombard Eaucourt L'Abbaye and the Butte de Warlencourt. The battery participated in a heavy bombardment of the Gallwitz Line on 5 November, followed by some 'Chinese' (fake) attacks before the Somme offensive died out in mid-November. It supported the continuing Operations on the Ancre, January–March 1917. On 30 January 1917, Maj Carr was promoted to command 29th HAG and was replaced by Captain J.C. Lucas. On 28 January the battery began preparing new positions at Frise, and the guns began registration fire from 5 February. Targets over the following weeks included trenches, dugouts and bridges.

Arras
On 12 March the guns were hauled out and moved north to join 50th HAG under Third Army in the Arras sector, the first half battery arriving on 20 March. For the opening of the Battle of Arras on 9 April, the battery was deployed at Marœuil in support of XVII Corps. Before and during the attack 69th Siege Bty carried out CB tasks and fired on selected roads. XVII Corps attacked with three divisions and was largely successful, except for a hold-up on one flank. Large numbers of prisoners were taken in the German front line, demoralised by the bombardment. After the battle the battery prepared to dismount its guns, but several of the road wheels were destroyed by shellfire. 76th Siege Bty loaned some wheels so that the battery could complete the move. It went to Écurie, north of Arras, and switched to the command of 70th HAG for the subsequent stages of the Arras offensive, including the attacks on Oppy Wood.

Messines
The battery next moved to Neuve Eglise, to join 16th HAG with Second Army, as part of the artillery build-up for the forthcoming Battle of Messines. Once the battery had prepared its positions, it opened fire on Messines village on 29 May. The bombardment continued against enemy trenches until the assault went in on 7 June, following the explosion of huge mines. During the day the battery fired 1386 rounds between 03.00 and 23.00. The results of the limited attack were spectacular. The British artillery was repositioned after the battle, 69th Siege Bty moving up to La Petite Douve Farm, in the old German front line.

Nieuport
On 17 June the battery was pulled out of the line, leaving its guns in position and taking over those of 118th Siege Bty. The gunners rested and overhauled these guns until 3 July when they moved to Oostduinkerke on the Belgian coast to join 22nd HAG with Fourth Army. The BEF's next operation was the Flanders Offensive, aiming to break through at Ypres with a follow-up attack along the coast supported by amphibious landings (Operation Hush), for which Fourth Army had assembled round Nieuport. The guns began registering on targets on 9 July; next day British preparations were disrupted by a German spoiling attack. Over the following weeks the British batteries exchanged CB fire with their German opposite numbers with aircraft spotting for the guns: on 22 July 69th Siege Bty had a gun temporarily put out of action by a concentration of 11-inch shells, and next day had one gun totally destroyed. This continued, with occasional spells at rest camps, until 15 November when the battery was pulled out.

Major Cyril Scholefield took over command of the battery on 31 August. He was a Regular officer, who had been commissioned into the RGA just before the outbreak of war. Despite the static warfare, the battery's chain of command was frequently changed: to 45th HAG on 3 September, to 36th HAG on 6 October while in rest camp, and then to 15th HAG with XIX Corps Heavy Artillery under the Belgian Army (after Fourth Army HQ left) from 9 October to 26 November 1917.

Winter 1917–18
69th Siege Bty then returned to Marœuil where it joined 83rd HAG under First Army on 25 November 1917. The guns shared a position at Maison de la Cote ('X2') on the Arras–Bailleul road with a section of 8-inch howitzers from 135th Siege Bty. By now HAG allocations were becoming more fixed, and on 1 January 1918 they were converted into permanent RGA brigades. For the rest of the war the battery was part of 83rd (Mixed) Bde, RGA, along with one or two heavy batteries (60-pdrs), two 6-inch howitzer batteries and one of 8-inch howitzers. 83rd Brigade's role was CB work on XIII Corps' front, and with its excellent observation from Vimy Ridge its batteries were able to carry out some effective shoots against hostile batteries around Crest Wood. though during February and March German retaliatory fire on Bailleul, was heavy, especially with Mustard gas shells, which caused numerous casualties. 69th Siege Bty was rearmed with 9.2-inch Mark II howitzers and made up to a strength of six guns when a section from 504th Siege Bty arrived from England and  joined on 16 March 1918.

Spring Offensive
The German Spring Offensive was launched on 21 March. On 28 March it extended north to First Army's front (the Third Battle of Arras), beginning with a massive bombardment at 03.00. The batteries of 83rd Bde were supporting 56th (1st London) Division, but the attack initially came in on the adjacent XVII Corps. 69th Siege Bty had recently shifted its guns across the Bailleul road, and the German CB fire hit their old positions. Nevertheless, the battery was subjected to a barrage of high explosive (HE) and gas shells that passed across its positions at 03.15. The batteries opened fire on prearranged 'SOS' targets for XVII Corps at 04.00 but remained under fire themselves until 12.00. Many guns were temporarily put out of action when they were buried by debris from shell explosions. 69th Siege Bty suffered heavy casualties, with Maj Scholefield killed and the battery captain severely wounded, together with another officer; 3 ORs were reported killed and 20 wounded. Scholefield was 22 years old when he was killed, and was buried with five other members of the battery at Roclincourt Commonwealth War Graves Commission Cemetery. Although 56th (1st L) Division was forced out of its forward zone, there was no breakthrough, and German losses were severe. The battle dwindled away and was over by nightfall.

Major Dudley Hire (Brigadier, RA, of Middle East Command during World War II) took over as Officer Commanding 69th Siege Bty, and in April and May the guns resumed harassing fire against the Germans in support of 4th Canadian Division, which had taken over the line. The work included nightly 'corps salvoes' and concentrations against enemy trenches, dispersing working parties, occasional CB shoots with the flash spotters, and regular aeroplane shoots during daytime.

Hundred Days Offensive
The guns resumed harassing fire (HF) against the Germans in support of Canadian Corps, which had taken over the line, and continued through the spring and early summer until 83rd Bde was withdrawn into GHQ Reserve on 19 July, when 69th Siege Bty was temporarily detached to 16th Bde, RGA, with VIII Corps. On 1 August 83rd Bde reassembled at Hesdin and entrained for Gentelles Wood in the Somme sector to rejoin Canadian Corps, now under Fourth Army. The heavy howitzers were got into position just in time to participate in the Battle of Amiens on 8 August. The attack went in at 04.20 and by 10.15 the enemy had been driven back out of range of the heavy guns. The brigade was left behind, and it was not until 13 August that 69th Siege Bty dragged its howitzers and ammunition up to Folies and began registering targets at Damery for the Canadians' follow-up attack on 15 August. It also manned a brigade of captured German heavy guns, which it fired in support of the attack. The Allied Hundred Days Offensive was now well under way.

During the Battle of Albert (23 August) 83rd Bde's batteries fired in support of the French XXXI Corps, which had relieved the Canadians but made little progress. The French finally captured Fresnoy-lès-Roye on 26 August, leaving 69th and 135th Siege Btys behind once more. 69th Siege Bty finally joined the rest of the brigade near Nesle on 30 August. By early September 83rd Bde noted that hostile shelling was well below normal levels, and as the enemy pulled back out of range its batteries were placed in GHQ Reserve at Renancourt near Amiens and underwent training. It rejoined Fourth Army on 14 September and the caterpillar tractors began dragging the heavy guns up via Villers-Brettoneux, while 69th Siege Bty sent its gunners forward to begin laying platforms near St Quentin Wood. By 18 September the guns were in position, ammunition had been brought up to forward dumps and the brigade fired in support of the surprise attack of the Battle of Épehy. The initial attack was successful and the artillery then crushed a German counter-attack.

After carrying out HF tasks and fire support for preliminary operations to close up to the Hindenburg Line, 83rd Bde was ready to support IX Corps' attack on the St Quentin Canal. After two days' bombardment of enemy trenches and machine gun positions, the assault went in on 29 September. 46th (North Midland) Division, which had to storm the canal itself, had the heaviest level of artillery support of any British division in the war. 69th Siege Bty's role was to breach the canal embankment from Bellenglise to the canal bend in an attempt to drain the water. The assault was a smashing success: 46th (NM) Division swarmed over the canal across captured bridges and dams, using lifebelts and planks, and took its final objectives before nightfall. Next day 69th Siege Bty fired concentrations on Thorigny (near Lehaucourt) supporting 1st Division's successful follow-up attack.

83rd Brigade now began moving its lighter guns forward across the canal to support 46th (NM) Division in the pursuit, leaving behind the 9.2- and 8-inch howitzers of 69th and 135th Siege Btys under the temporary command of 14th Bde, RGA, at Lehaucourt in corps reserve. It was not until the night of 12/13 October that it caught up with the rest of the brigade north of Bohain. On 14 October it bombarded Regnicourt and Vaux Andigny, which had defied an attack by 46th (NM) Division. Fourth Army's next setpiece operation was the Battle of the Selle, with 83rd Bde once more supporting IX Corps. On 15 October the battery fire on Bois St Pierre, and 16 October was devoted to HF shoots on enemy communications. A fresh British attack at 17.00 made further progress, and next morning the brigade put down heavy barrages in front of a renewed attack at 11.30. The Germans retired across the Sambre–Oise Canal and destroyed the bridges behind them.

Once again 135th and 69th Siege Btys had to be left behind as the lighter guns followed the pursuit.  83rd Brigade was pulled out for rest on 25 October, but 69th Siege Bty was moved up into position on 1 November and on 4 November the whole brigade supported 1st Division's successful attack across the Sambre–Oise Canal. Bridgeheads were established and the infantry pushed on  beyond the canal. Next day the German artillery could be seen pulling out and retreating. Again, 69th Siege Bty had to be left behind as 83rd Bde crossed the canal and joined the pursuit. It was still there with 12th Bde, RGA, when the Armistice with Germany came into force on 11 November.

During December 1918 69th Siege Battery was quartered at Sorée near Namur for the winter and demobilisation began in the new year. The battery was finally disbanded on 26 October 1919.

See also
  Newsreel film of a 9.2-inch howitzer being fired.

Notes

References

 Anon, A History of the South African Heavy Artillery: Seventy-First Siege Battery July 1915–November 1918, London: Miles & Co, ca 1920/Uckfield: Naval & Military Press, 2013, .
 Maj A.F. Becke,History of the Great War: Order of Battle of Divisions, Part 4: The Army Council, GHQs, Armies, and Corps 1914–1918, London: HM Stationery Office, 1944/Uckfield: Naval & Military Press, 2007, .
 Maj A.F. Becke,History of the Great War: Order of Battle of Divisions, Part 2b: The 2nd-Line Territorial Force Divisions (57th–69th), with the Home-Service Divisions (71st–73rd) and 74th and 75th Divisions, London: HM Stationery Office, 1937/Uckfield: Naval & Military Press, 2007, .
 Gregory Blaxland, Amiens: 1918, London: Frederick Muller, 1968/Star, 1981, .
 Maj C.H. Dudley Ward, The Fifty Sixth Division, 1st London Territorial Division, 1914–1918, London: John Murray, 1921/Uckfield: Naval & Military Press, 2001, . 
 Brig-Gen Sir James E. Edmonds, History of the Great War: Military Operations, France and Belgium, 1916, Vol I, London: Macmillan,1932/Woking: Shearer, 1986, .
 Brig-Gen Sir James E. Edmonds, History of the Great War: Military Operations, France and Belgium 1917, Vol II, Messines and Third Ypres (Passchendaele), London: HM Stationery Office, 1948/Uckfield: Imperial War Museum and Naval and Military Press, 2009, .
 Brig-Gen Sir James E. Edmonds, History of the Great War: Military Operations, France and Belgium 1918, Vol II, March–April: Continuation of the German Offensives, London: Macmillan, 1937/Imperial War Museum and Battery Press, 1995, /Uckfield: Naval & Military Press, 2009, .
 Brig-Gen Sir James E. Edmonds, History of the Great War: Military Operations, France and Belgium 1918, Vol IV, 8th August–26th September: The Franco-British Offensive, London: Macmillan, 1939/Uckfield: Imperial War Museum and Naval & Military, 2009, .
 Brig-Gen Sir James E. Edmonds & Lt-Col R. Maxwell-Hyslop, History of the Great War: Military Operations, France and Belgium 1918, Vol V, 26th September–11th November, The Advance to Victory, London: HM Stationery Office, 1947/Imperial War Museum and Battery Press, 1993, .
 Capt Cyril Falls, History of the Great War: Military Operations, France and Belgium 1917, Vol I, The German Retreat to the Hindenburg Line and the Battle of Arras, London: Macmillan, 1940/London: Imperial War Museum & Battery Press/Uckfield: Naval and Military Press, 2009, .
 Gen Sir Martin Farndale, History of the Royal Regiment of Artillery: Western Front 1914–18, Woolwich: Royal Artillery Institution, 1986, .
 Gen Sir Martin Farndale, History of the Royal Regiment of Artillery: The Forgotten Fronts and the Home Base 1914–18, Woolwich: Royal Artillery Institution, 1988, .
 Gen Sir Martin Farndale, History of the Royal Regiment of Artillery: The Years of Defeat: Europe and North Africa, 1939–1941, Woolwich: Royal Artillery Institution, 1988/London: Brasseys, 1996, .
 Gen Sir Anthony Farrar-Hockley, The Somme, London: Batsford, 1954/Pan 1966, .
 J.B.M. Frederick, Lineage Book of British Land Forces 1660–1978, Vol II, Wakefield: Microform Academic, 1984, .
 Norman E.H. Litchfield, The Territorial Artillery 1908–1988 (Their Lineage, Uniforms and Badges), Nottingham: Sherwood Press, 1992, .
 Col K. W. Maurice-Jones, The History of Coast Artillery in the British Army, London: Royal Artillery Institution, 1959/Uckfield: Naval & Military Press, 2005, .
 Simon Peaple, Mud, Blood and Determination: The History of the 46th (North Midland) Division in the Great War, Solihull: Helion, 2015, .
 L.F. Penstone, The History of 76 Siege Battery, R.G.A., 1937/Uckfield: Naval & Military Press, 2009, .
 Lt D.J. Walters & Lt C.R. Hurle Hobbs, The History of the 135th Siege Battery R.G.A., 1921/Uckfield: Naval & Military Press, 2004, .
 Instructions Issued by The War Office During October, 1914, London: HM Stationery Office, 1917.
 Instructions Issued by The War Office During October, 1915, London: HM Stationery Office.
 Lt-Col Michael Young, Army Service Corps 1902–1918, Barnsley: Leo Cooper, 2000, .

External links
 Chris Baker, The Long, Long Trail
 Commonwealth War Graves Commission records
 Findagrave.com
 Generals of World War II
 Imperial War Museum, Lives of the First World War

Siege batteries of the Royal Garrison Artillery
Military units and formations in Sussex
Military units and formations established in 1915
Military units and formations disestablished in 1919